The Niki Lightning is a fully enclosed two-seater tricycle autogyro of composite construction, designed and built by Niki Rotor Aviation in Bulgaria. It was introduced in 2009

Design and development
The Lightning's cockpit pod accommodates a pilot and passenger in tandem. The main rotor is two-bladed, with a pre-rotator. Unconventionally the tail boom is mounted though the centre of the propeller shaft. The boom may be unbolted and removed to aid access to the engine and prop.

There is a choice of two very compact D-Motor engines (both liquid-cooled horizontally-opposed side-valve four-strokes): either the   4-cylinder LF26  or the  6-cylinder LF39. The  engine is sited behind the cockpit, driving a 3- or 4-bladed ground-adjustable pusher propeller which is coaxial with the tail boom. The D-Motor engines are direct-drive units redlined at 3,000 rpm. The engines are sited beneath the thrust line of the propeller; instead of using a gearbox, the Lightning uses a multi-belt-drive reduction system of about 3:2 ratio, resulting in an efficient propeller speed of up to 2,000 rpm. This arrangement avoids the necessity of a tailboom beneath the propeller, giving a smoother empenage and reducing drag. Beneath the tail-fin a spring-steel tailskid is fitted, to inhibit propeller strikes.

The Lightning may be flown with its side doors removed.

An alternative engine for the Niki Lightning is the Rotax 914UL (but the normal Rotax gearbox would be dispensed with in favour of the drive belts).

Specifications (D-Motor LF39)

See also
 AutoGyro Calidus
 Niki Kallithea
 RotorSport UK Calidus
 Sport Copter Lightning

References

External links 
 

Lightning
Single-engined pusher autogyros
2000s Bulgarian sport aircraft